Alu Hajju (also Romanized as ‘Alū Ḩājjū; also known as Alī Hājī, ‘Alī Ḩājjū, and ‘Alī Ḩājjī) is a village in Chaybasar-e Shomali Rural District, Bazargan District, Maku County, West Azerbaijan Province, Iran. At the 2006 census, its population was 295, in 52 families.

References 

Populated places in Maku County